The Alianca UAP Challenger was a golf tournament on the Challenge Tour, held in 1996 and 1997 in Portugal.

Winners

References

External links
Coverage on the Challenge Tour's official site

Former Challenge Tour events
Golf tournaments in Portugal